Serter is a surname, likely of Turkish origin. Notable people with the surname include:
 Nur Serter (born 1948), Turkish academic and politician
 Öykü Serter (born 1975), Turkish TV presenter, actress, and DJ